West Virginia's 4th Senate district is one of 17 districts in the West Virginia Senate. It is currently represented by Republicans Eric Tarr and Amy Grady. All districts in the West Virginia Senate elect two members to staggered four-year terms.

Geography
District 4 is based in Jackson County, Mason County, and parts of Putnam and Roane Counties to the north of Charleston. It includes the communities of Spencer, Ravenswood, Ripley, Point Pleasant, New Haven, Hurricane, Winfield, and Teays Valley.

The district overlaps with West Virginia's 2nd congressional district and West Virginia's 3rd congressional district, and with the 11th, 12th, 13th, 14th, 15th, 22nd, 38th districts of the West Virginia House of Delegates. It borders the state of Ohio.

Recent election results

2022

Historical election results

2020

2018

2016

2014

2012

Federal and statewide results in District 4

References

4
Jackson County, West Virginia
Mason County, West Virginia
Putnam County, West Virginia
Roane County, West Virginia